Boutigny may refer to several communes in France:

 Boutigny, Seine-et-Marne, in Seine-et-Marne département
 Boutigny-Prouais, a commune in the Eure-et-Loir département
 Boutigny-sur-Essonne, a commune in the Essonne département, a suburb of Paris